The Women's Super Series, previously known as the Women's Super 3s, is a women's domestic cricket tournament organised by Cricket Ireland. The tournament began in 2015 as a combined 50-over and Twenty20 tournament, with three teams taking part: Dragons, Scorchers and Typhoons. In 2020, the tournament was reduced to two teams and only used a 50-over format. In 2021, the Super Series was split into separate 50-over and Twenty20 tournaments. In 2022, the tournament returned to a three team format.

Scorchers have won 6 titles, Dragons have won 3 titles and Typhoons have won one title.

History
The tournament began in 2015, with the aim of bringing together the best players from Ireland and help bridge the gap between club cricket and international cricket. Three teams, with no set geographical base, competed in the first tournament: Dragons, Scorchers and Typhoons. The teams played 8 matches, playing each team twice in both 50-over and Twenty20 formats, but with one table for the whole competition. Scorchers were the inaugural winners of the competition, with 5 wins.

The following season, 2016, the tournament followed a similar format, albeit with teams only playing two T20 matches each, and was newly sponsored by Toyota Ireland. Dragons won their first title. 2017 saw the number of games per team expand to 10, and Scorchers won their second title.

The same format was kept for the 2018 and 2019 tournaments, and Dragons won both competitions, claiming their second and third titles. In 2020, the tournament format was changed due to the impact of the COVID-19 pandemic: the number of teams was reduced to two (Scorchers and Typhoons) due to player unavailability during the pandemic, and the schedule was condensed, with only 50-over cricket taking place. Typhoons won the tournament, their first title, on Net Run Rate after both sides won four matches each.

In 2021, the tournament was split into the Super 50 Cup (50-over format) and Super 20 Trophy (Twenty20 format) and remained with two teams competing, due to the ongoing impact of COVID-19. The tournament was sponsored by Arachas. In June, Scorchers won the 50-over section of the tournament, winning four of the seven matches against Typhoons, and in August were victorious in the T20 section of the tournament, winning four of the six matches.

In 2022, Dragons returned to the competition. Scorchers won both the T20 and 50-over titles.

Teams

Results

See also
 Inter-Provincial Cup
 Inter-Provincial Trophy

References

 
Irish domestic cricket competitions
Women's cricket competitions in Ireland
Recurring sporting events established in 2015
Limited overs cricket
Twenty20 cricket leagues